The East Hants Penguins are a Junior ice hockey team from East Hants, Nova Scotia, Canada.  The Penguins play in the Nova Scotia Junior Hockey League and are the 2007 Don Johnson Cup Maritime Junior B Champions.

History
The Penguins were founded in 2000, but East Hants has a history that dates back decades in junior hockey.

In 2007, the Penguins won their first league title and went on to the Don Johnson Cup Maritime Junior B Championships.  They defeated the host Cumberland County Blues 7–2, Central West Junior Hockey League's Central Jr. Cataracts 11–2, New Brunswick's Madawaska 506 who played in Quebec all season 12–4, and the Island Junior Hockey League's Kensington Vipers 6–5 in overtime to finish first in the tournament round robin with a 4–0–0 record.  In the semi-final, the Penguins again crushed Central 8–3 and in the final they defeated Cumberland County 2–0 to win their first and only Don Johnson Cup.

In 2011–12, the Penguins finished second place in the regular season with a 24–8–2 record.  They would go on to win the league playoff championship.  At the 2012 Don Johnson Cup in St. John's, Newfoundland and Labrador, the Penguins would finish the round robin with a record of three wins and one loss.  The Penguins started the tournament with a 9–0 drubbing of the St. John's Junior Hockey League's Mount Pearl Jr. Blades.  Next, the Penguins beat the New Brunswick Junior B Hockey League's Moncton Vito's 5–2.  In the third game, the Penguins would win 3–2 in overtime to remain perfect, beating the Island Junior Hockey League's Kensington Vipers.  In the final game of the round robin, the Penguins would face the also undefeated host St. John's Jr. Caps.  The Jr. Caps won the game 3–2.  In the semi-finals, the Penguins defeated the Kensington Vipers again 2–1.  The Moncton Vito's upset the St. John's Jr. Caps in the other semi-final and were set to play the Penguins in the final.  The final went to overtime and the Vito's prevailed with a 2–1 victory.

Season-by-season record

{|class="wikitable"
|- align="center"  bgcolor="#dddddd"
|Season	||GP || W || OTWSOW || T/OTL || L || GF ||	GA || P || Results || Playoffs
|- align="center"
|2015–16  ||34    ||14   ||4    ||2   ||14    ||-   ||-    ||52  ||3rd of 6 Fred Fox5th of 11 NSJHL    ||Lost Div. Semifinal 1–4, (Blazers)
|- align="center"
|2016–17  ||34    ||16   ||4   ||1   ||13    ||163   ||142    ||57  ||4th of 6 Fred Fox5th of 11 NSJHL    ||Lost Div. Semifinal 3–4, (Maple Leafs)
|- align="center"
|2017–18  ||34    ||26   ||-   ||2   ||6    ||203   ||133    ||54  ||1st of 6 Fred Fox1st of 11 NSJHL    ||Won Div. Semifinal 4–1, (Maple Leafs)Won Div. Final, 4–1 (Colts)Lost League Finals 0–4 (Jr. Miners)advance to Don Johnson as  Jr. Miners are Host
|- align="center"
|2018–19  ||32    ||23  ||5   ||2   ||2    ||201   ||98    ||50  ||1st of 6 Fred Fox2nd of 12 NSJHL    ||Won Div. Semifinal 4–0, (Colts)Lost Div. Final, 2–4 (Blazers)
|- align="center"
|2019–20  ||32    ||23  ||8   ||0   ||1    ||179   ||123    ||47  ||1st of 6 Fred Fox3rd of 12 NSJHL    ||Won Div. Semifinal -–-, (Colts)Playoffs halted due to covid
|- align="center"
|2020–21  ||4    ||2  ||1   ||0   ||1    ||16   ||8    ||5  ||colspan=2|Season lost to COVID-19 pandemic
|- align="center"
|2021–22  ||17    ||10  ||0   ||0   ||0    ||79   ||59    ||20  ||<small>4th of 6 Fred Fox7th of 12 NSJHL</small>    ||Won Div. Semifinal 3–0, (Elks)Won Div. Final, 4-1 (Colts)L League Finals, 2-4 (Bulldogs)
|}

Don Johnson CupEastern Canada Jr B Championships'''

External links
East Hants Junior Penguins 

Ice hockey teams in Nova Scotia
2000 establishments in Nova Scotia
Ice hockey clubs established in 2000